The Kolka–Karmadon rock-ice slide occurred on the northern slope of the Mount Kazbek massif in North Ossetia–Alania on 20 September 2002, following a partial collapse of the Kolka Glacier. The resulting avalanche and mudflow killed more than 120 people, including a film crew of 27 people, among them Russian actor and director Sergei Bodrov Jr.  While this type of avalanche is not uncommon, this particular event is considered extraordinary because of several aspects.

Collapse
The main deposit settled  from the face of Dzhimarai-Khokh. Two villages along the gorge were under surveillance as flood waters backed up along the choked rivers. It finally came to rest in the village of Nizhniy Karmadon, burying most of the village in ice, snow, and debris. On September 25, a first round of explosives intended to break up the avalanche flow was unsuccessful in reducing flood waters lapping through the village of Gornaya Saniba. The avalanche had two distinct flows.

Notable victims
Sergei Bodrov Jr.
Vladimir Kartashov

See also

List of avalanches

References

External links
 
 
 

Geography of North Ossetia–Alania
Natural disasters in Russia
2002 natural disasters
2002 disasters in Russia
Landslides in Russia
Landslides in 2002
2000s avalanches
September 2002 events in Russia
Avalanches in Russia